Metromover is a free mass transit automated people mover train system operated by Miami-Dade Transit in Miami, Florida, United States. Metromover serves the Downtown Miami, Brickell, Park West and Arts & Entertainment District neighborhoods. Metromover connects directly with Metrorail at Government Center and Brickell stations. It also connects to Metrobus with dedicated bus loops at Government Center and Adrienne Arsht Center station. It originally began service to the Downtown/Inner Loop on April 17, 1986, and was later expanded with the Omni and Brickell Loop extensions on May 26, 1994.

The Metromover serves primarily as an alternative way to travel within the greater Downtown Miami neighborhoods. The system is composed of three loops and 21 stations. The stations are located approximately two blocks away from each other, and connect near all major buildings and places in the Downtown area.

Out of only three downtown people movers in the United States, the other two being the Jacksonville Skyway and the Detroit People Mover, the Metromover is by far the most successful in terms of ridership, the only completed system of the three, and considered to be a catalyst for downtown development.

History

In 1987, the then-one-year-old people mover system set a record in daily ridership of 33,053 on a Saturday, attributed to the new Bayside Marketplace. That same year was when the planning began to extend the system to Brickell and Arts & Entertainment District (then Omni), which would not be completed until 1994. Until November 2002 when the half-penny transit tax was approved, the Metromover had a fare of 25 cents. The fare was lifted because it was realized that the cost of collecting the fare nearly exceeded the revenue generated from the fare, as well as the fact that more Metromover ridership would likely lead to more Metrorail ridership.  After becoming free, from 2002 to 2005, along with a large increase in population, rising gas prices and booming downtown development, Metromover ridership nearly doubled from 4.7 million in 2002 to about 9 million in 2005. However, ridership fell with the subsequent economic downturn and high unemployment in the latter half of the decade. By 2012, ridership had once again increased with downtown population, high gas prices and a recovering economy. In early 2011, Metromover saw an increase in ridership during a sharp peak in gas prices, at the same time as there was a decrease in Metrorail and Metrobus ridership as well as a decrease in employment. However, from January 2010 to January 2011, Metrorail saw a 7% increase in ridership, and both Metrorail and Metromover were expected to see additional ridership increases throughout 2011 due to rising fuel prices. When the Omni and Brickell extensions were first planned, it was estimated that ridership on the fared system would reach 43,000 daily by 2000, a number the now free system has yet to reach.

Operations 
There are 21 accessible Metromover stations located throughout Downtown Miami and Brickell roughly every two blocks. The Metromover links all of Downtown and Brickell's major office buildings, residential buildings, hotels, and retail centers. Major attractions such as the Stephen P. Clark Government Center, American Airlines Arena, Arsht Performing Arts Center, the Cultural Plaza (Miami Art Museum, Historical Museum of Southern Florida, Miami Main Library), Bayside Marketplace, Mary Brickell Village, Miami-Dade College, Museum Park (which services Perez Art Museum Miami as well as the Frost Science Museum) and the Brickell Financial District can all be reached by the Metromover.

Running clockwise, the Downtown (Inner) Loop serves all Downtown stations except Third Street station.  The Outer Loop (Brickell and Omni Loops) runs counterclockwise and share tracks around the downtown area, serving all stations except for Miami Avenue Station. The Brickell loop runs a line into the Brickell area to the south of downtown, while the Omni Loop contains a line with stations in the Arts & Entertainment District neighborhood north of Downtown. This unusual pattern, a circular central loop where the trains running counterclockwise are those running from and back to destinations outside the loop, whereas trains in the opposite clockwise direction are only running a tight inner circular route, is also followed by the New York JFK Airport AirTrain system. The inner loop generally runs tandem two car trains while the outer loops only run with single cars. Each car can carry over 90 passengers.

The Metromover car maintenance base, unusual for a maintenance yard, is a building located downtown, at SW 1st Ave and SW 1st St, which lies between Government Center and 3rd St stations on the outer counterclockwise loop, at the point where the two loops split to run in adjacent parallel streets.

All loops run from 5 am to just after midnight, from Sunday to Thursday. On Friday and Saturday nights, service is extended until 2 am. This schedule is adjusted during events. Trains on the Inner Loop run in tandem and arrive every 90 seconds during rush hours and every three minutes otherwise. Outer Loop trains arrive every 5 to 6 minutes; every 2.5 to 3 minutes where the track is shared.

The cost of building the system was about $153.3 million. The operating budget for the Inner and Outer (Brickell and Omni) loops in FY 2007 was $8,888,794. Ridership total for FY 2007 was 8.7 million. Not including capital costs, this gives an approximate cost of $1.02 per ride.  Metromover does not charge for rides; however, a $2.25/1.1 fee is charged if transferring to Metrorail or Metrobus.

Stations

The Metromover currently operates 21 stations, all within the Miami city limits.

Rolling stock

Metromover mainly uses 29 Bombardier Innovia APM 100 vehicles, the first 12 of which were delivered during the summer and fall of 2008. These newer vehicles replaced the first 12 Westinghouse C-100 cars which were built by Westinghouse Electric in 1984, and include a more aerodynamic design, as well as an onboard CCTV system. Deliveries of an additional 17 cars from Bombardier Transportation began in July 2010, and as of early 2014 have largely replaced the second order of 17 Adtranz C-100 vehicles, built by Adtranz predecessor AEG-Westinghouse in 1992.

Ridership
Sortable chart detailing monthly weekday ridership averages by Calendar Year; right hand chart giving annual averages may use "fiscal year" without disclosure, where the FY begins in October and has 75% of its time in the next year with only 25% in the starting year. Note the large jump in ridership in 2002 when the fare was removed after the passing of the half-penny tax. Yearly averages are rounded to the nearest 500, and the highest month is also in bold. After years of growth, Metromover ridership began falling in 2017, following years of sharp declines in Metrobus and Metrorail ridership. Ridership peaked again in early 2020 at over 30,000 per weekday before crashing during the years long covid pandemic.

Average weekday passengers
This table includes Metrorail ridership as the two systems were built together and are mutually reliant on the thousands of daily transfers at Government Center and Brickell stations. 

*Record high

Incidents

 On September 10, 2008, a man was trying to reach his hat that was blown off his head by a gust of wind. While doing so he was struck and killed by a Metromover car.
 On July 21, 2010, two northbound cars collided, causing minor injuries to 16 passengers.
 On February 5, 2014, a man was struck and killed at the Riverwalk Station. Witnesses reported that the man jumped in front of the approaching Metromover car.

Expansion
Port of Miami: In May 2011, a study was proposed to analyze the idea of extending the Metromover to the PortMiami. This, with Metrorail and the new MIA Mover would create a direct rail transit link from the airport to the seaport. However, the study, which would take at least a year and cost about $120,000, was only a proposal to be voted on and the idea has not been reported on since 2014.

South Beach: There have been multiple proposals for a Metromover service to southern Miami Beach. One was as part of the proposed Resorts World Miami megaproject in Miami's Arts & Entertainment District neighborhood, announced in mid-2011, a Metromover expansion from Downtown Miami to South Beach was being pushed as recompense for building a casino. The line could potentially run from the Arts & Entertainment District across the Venetian Causeway to 17th Street in South Beach ending at the Miami Beach Convention Center. The line could have three stations in South Beach along 17th Street- Alton Road, Meridian Avenue and Washington Avenue. This would connect Miami Beach to rail mass transit for the first time, and provide a direct rail connection into one of the Miami area's most visited neighborhoods. The line would also allow for future expansions later across South Beach. More recently, proposals for a separate, most likely at-grade, light-rail system known as BayLink have been revived.

Miami-Dade originally planned to have a monorail along the southern edge of MacArthur Causeway from Downtown Miami to South Beach. However, in November 2022, the original plan would be changed to Metromover because the budget did not allow for the proposed monorail and it would not provide a one-seat ride from Downtown Miami to South Beach.

Northward Expansion: A county plan unveiled in March 2021 shows an extension north from the current School Board station along North Miami Avenue, connecting the system to Midtown, Wynwood, and The Design District. An infill station called Herald Plaza would also be added on the site of the former Miami Herald building, eventually connecting the Metromover system to Miami Beach.

See also
 Transportation in Miami
 Metrorail (Miami-Dade County)
 Tri-Rail
 MIA Mover
 Bukit Panjang LRT

References

External links

 
 Metromover on Miami-Dade County's official website

 
Transportation in Miami
Railway lines opened in 1986
Innovia people movers
Urban people mover systems
People mover systems in the United States
Zero-fare transport services
1986 establishments in Florida